George Lafayette Crenshaw (1854 – February 18, 1937),  was a  real estate developer and banker who help developed several upscale residential developments in mid-city Los Angeles and Southern Los Angeles neighborhoods in the early 1900s including Lafayette Square and Wellington Square.  He was the owner of C.H. Brown Banking Company in Missouri and the Crenshaw Security Company in Los Angeles, California.

Biography
After the First World War, Los Angeles was a town that was looking for an uptick in population. Around the turn of the twentieth century, there was a large oil boom in southern California. Between the extraordinary climate that California had to offer and the rich resources that provided jobs in the oil and agricultural industries, the state experienced great population booms. In Los Angeles, Crenshaw invested in and oversaw ten residential real estate ventures to help satiate the growth; one of the new wealthy neighborhoods would become Wellington Square and Lafayette Square in Los Angeles.

"A man who left an indelible impression upon his adopted city was George L. Crenshaw, the real estate pioneer who died here Wednesday. His name will continue to be known because of the designation of the great boulevard in the West End area. His contributions to the (sic) upbuilding of Los Angeles from the time of his arrival here in 1905 were unceasing. He was one of a dwindling group of early-day real estate leaders whose monuments are the homes of countless thousands. They did much to acquaint the world with the attractions of Southern California. Mr. Crenshaw deserves a place in the front rank of those developers. They formed the bone and sinew of a metropolis."

Legacy

The Crenshaw district of Los Angeles and its principal thoroughfare, Crenshaw Boulevard and Destination Crenshaw bear his name.

References

LaFayette Square Historic Preservation Overlay Zone; LaFayette Organization; 2011

American real estate businesspeople
American bankers
History of Los Angeles
1854 births
1937 deaths